The Act for better Securing the Duties of East India Goods was (6 Ann c.3) was an Act of the Parliament of Great Britain.

The Act was considered by a committee of the House of Lords on 15 December 1707, after which Lord Herbert reported that it was "fit to pass, without any Amendment", which was then done. It received royal assent on 18 December 1707. The act extended the monopoly of the English East India Company across Scotland thus encompassing the whole of the new United Kingdom. Thus this corporation based in the City of London was able to enjoy a set of privileges which enabled it, rather than private British subjects, to dominate trade in half of the emerging British Empire.

References

Great Britain Acts of Parliament 1707
British East India Company